Garreh Nazerabad (also Romanized as Garreh Naz̧erābād; also known as Chehel Gereh, Gareh, and Garreh) is a village in Poshtkuh-e Rostam Rural District, Sorna District, Rostam County, Fars Province, Iran. At the 2006 census, its population was 90, in 18 families.

References 

Populated places in Rostam County